Tales of Instant Knowledge and Sure Death is the 1990 debut studio album by avant-garde rock band Idiot Flesh.

Track listing

Personnel
E. Horace (Gene) Jun – guitar, vocals
Nils James Larson Frykdahl – flute, vocals, guitar, saxophone, percussion
Daniel Wilkins Rathbun – bass, engineer, vocals, cello
Daniel Aaron Roth – drums, metal percussion, saxophone, piano
Charles "Chuck" LaBarge Stevenson Squier – drums, cover art

Guest musicians
Danny Tunick – chimes, glockenspiel
William Winant – glockenspiel, marimba
Peter Josheff – clarinet

Production
Per Frykdahl – cover art
Mark Stichman – production, engineer
Rance Mannion – engineer

References

1990 debut albums